The Brooklyner is a skyscraper at 111 Lawrence Street in Downtown Brooklyn, New York City. Built by the Clarett Group and designed by GKV Architects, with WSP Cantor Seinuk (Structural Engineers), and Langan Engineering (Geotechnical Engineers), it became the tallest building in Brooklyn, surpassing the Williamsburgh Savings Bank Tower in 2010. Later, in 2014, the Brooklyner was surpassed by 388 Bridge Street for the tallest skyscraper in the borough.

The structure contains 491 rental units and is currently managed by Equity Residential.

Gallery

See also
 List of tallest buildings in Brooklyn
 List of tallest buildings in New York City

References

External links
 Official website
The Brooklyner at GKV Architects
The Brooklyner on CTBUH
The Brooklyner on Emporis
The Brooklyner on the Skyscraperpage.com

Residential buildings in Brooklyn
Residential skyscrapers in New York City
Residential buildings completed in 2010
Downtown Brooklyn
2010s architecture in the United States
2010 establishments in New York City
Condominiums and housing cooperatives in Brooklyn
Postmodern architecture
Skyscrapers in Brooklyn